F9 (also known as F9: The Fast Saga and internationally as Fast & Furious 9) is a 2021 American action film directed by Justin Lin from a screenplay he co-wrote with Daniel Casey, based on a story by Lin, Casey, and Alfredo Botello. It is the sequel to The Fate of the Furious (2017), serving as the ninth main installment and the tenth full-length film in the Fast & Furious franchise. It stars Vin Diesel as Dominic Toretto, alongside Michelle Rodriguez, Tyrese Gibson, Chris "Ludacris" Bridges, John Cena, Nathalie Emmanuel, Jordana Brewster, Sung Kang, Michael Rooker, Helen Mirren, Kurt Russell, Charlize Theron, Thue Ersted Rasmussen and Anna Sawai. In the film, Dominic Toretto and his family must stop a world-shattering plot headed by a rogue covert operative named Jakob Toretto (Cena), Dominic's estranged long lost brother, and his financier Otto (Rasmussen), both of whom have joined forces with cyberterrorist Cipher (Theron) in order to obtain a new dangerous weapons program named Project Aries.

With a ninth film planned since 2014, Lin was confirmed as director in October 2017, returning to the franchise since last directing Fast & Furious 6 (2013). F9 is the first film in the franchise since The Fast and the Furious: Tokyo Drift (2006) not written by Chris Morgan. Dwayne Johnson, who appeared in the previous four films, was announced to return in April 2017, but confirmed his absence in January 2019. The rest of the cast was finalized with the addition of Cena six months later. Brian Tyler returned to compose the score.

Principal photography began in June 2019 and lasted until that November, with filming locations including London, Edinburgh,  Tbilisi, Los Angeles, and Thailand, with an estimated production budget of $200–225 million. 

F9 was originally scheduled for worldwide release by Universal Pictures on April 19, 2019, but was delayed several times, first due to the release of Hobbs & Shaw (2019) and planned release of the Metro-Goldwyn-Mayer film No Time to Die (2021), and then the COVID-19 pandemic. It premiered in South Korea and released internationally on May 20, 2021; it was released in the United Kingdom on June 24, then released in the United States on June 25. The film received mostly mixed reviews from critics, with some praise for the stunts and Lin's direction, while it was criticized for its unrealistic action sequences, lack of a plot and revision of tropes. It set several pandemic box office records and grossed over $726 million worldwide, becoming the fifth-highest-grossing film of 2021. A sequel, Fast X, is set to be released in the United States on May 19, 2023.

Plot
In 1989, Jack Toretto participates in an asphalt late model race on a short track, with his sons Dominic and Jakob working in the pit crew. Dom argues with rival racer Kenny Linder about his dirty tactics. During the race, Linder's car clips Jack's bumper, causing his car to crash and burn, killing him. A week after, Dom is arrested for beating Linder to near death. While serving his sentence, he recalls that Jakob had worked on their father's car the day he died and concludes that Jakob killed their father. Upon release, Dom confronts and challenges Jakob to a race, forcing him to leave town when he loses.

Thirty years later, two years after the confrontation against cyberterrorist Cipher, Dom is retired and raising his son Brian with his wife, Letty Ortiz. Roman Pearce, Tej Parker, and Ramsey arrive with news that, shortly after arresting Cipher, Mr. Nobody's plane was attacked by rogue agents, who abducted Cipher and crashed in Montequinto, a fictional Central American country. Dom agrees to help them after realizing Jakob is involved. Searching the plane, they find part of a device named Project Aries, which can hack into any computer-controlled system. The team is ambushed by a private army led by Jakob, who steals the device. Michael Stasiak helps Dom's crew escape to their safe house at the Caspian Sea, and Dom's sister Mia arrives to help. The team learns that Han Lue is connected to Project Aries, and Letty and Mia go to Tokyo to investigate.

Meanwhile, Jakob meets with Otto, his associate and financier. Cipher, who is being held at their base, tells Jakob that the other half of Aries is in Edinburgh. Dom meets his father's former mechanic, Buddy, who took Jakob in after his exile, and learns that Jakob is in London. In Tokyo, Letty and Mia find Han alive, along with his ward, Elle. Roman and Tej recruit Sean Boswell, Twinkie, and Earl, who have been working on a "rocket car". In London, Dom meets Queenie Shaw, who gives him Jakob's location. Dom confronts Otto and Jakob; Otto has Dom arrested, but Leysa, Dom's old friend, rescues him. Tej, Roman, and Ramsey join Dom in Edinburgh, where Jakob is using an electromagnet to steal the other half of the Project Aries device. Tej and Roman find the truck containing the electromagnet; as they fight Otto's men, Ramsey commandeers the truck to chase after Otto. 

Dom intercepts Jakob and the two fight throughout the city. Before Otto can extract Jakob, Ramsey runs his car off the road and uses the electromagnet to capture Jakob. At the safe house, Han reveals that he was assigned by Mr. Nobody to protect Elle and Project Aries, as Elle's DNA is its biometric activation key. When one of Mr. Nobody's agents, later revealed to be Jakob, went rogue, they used Deckard Shaw to fake Han's death and protect Elle. Otto attacks the safehouse and frees Jakob, who reveals to Dom that their father, wanting to escape deep debt, had instructed Jakob to tamper with his car to throw the race. Jakob and Otto kidnap Elle and take the other half of the Project Aries device. Otto launches a satellite into orbit, while Jakob has Elle activate Aries. They begin uploading Aries to the satellite, moving throughout Tbilisi in an armored truck. 

Dom, Letty, Mia, Ramsey, and Han race to stop the upload. As Mia and Han try to breach the truck, Otto double-crosses Jakob, throwing him off the truck. Dom and Mia save Jakob, and in turn he helps Dom access the truck. Using the rocket car, Tej and Roman enter orbit and destroy the satellite, stopping the upload. Cipher, now working alongside Otto, bombs the truck using a UAV in an attempt to kill Dom, unintentionally killing Otto. Dom uses the ricocheting truck to destroy Cipher's drone, and Cipher escapes. Dom and Mia reconcile with Jakob, and allow him to escape custody in Dom's car. Tej and Roman reach the International Space Station and are safely returned to Earth. The team celebrates their success with a barbecue at Dom's house. While preparing to say grace, Brian O'Conner arrives with his car in the driveway.

In a mid-credits scene, Deckard comes face-to-face with Han, shocked to see him alive.

Cast

 Vin Diesel as Dominic Toretto: A former criminal and professional street racer who has retired and settled down with his wife, Letty, and his son, Brian Marcos. Diesel's son Vincent Sinclair portrays a young Dominic, while Vinnie Bennett portrays a teenage Dominic.
 Michelle Rodriguez as Letty Ortiz-Toretto: Dom's wife, Brian Marcos's stepmother, and a former criminal and professional street racer. Azia Dinea Hale portrays a young Letty.
 Tyrese Gibson as Roman Pearce: An ex-habitual offender, expert street racer and a member of Dom's team.
 Chris "Ludacris" Bridges as Tej Parker: A mechanic from Miami and a member of Dom's team.
 John Cena as Jakob Toretto: Dom and Mia's estranged brother who is working as a master thief, assassin, and high-performance driver; also Mr. Nobody's rogue agent. Finn Cole portrays a young Jakob.
 Nathalie Emmanuel as Ramsey: A British computer hacktivist and a member of Dom's team.
 Jordana Brewster as Mia Toretto: Dom and Jakob's sister and a member of the former's team who has settled down with her partner, Brian O'Conner, and their two children. Siena Agudong portrays a young Mia.
 Sung Kang as Han Lue: A member of Dom's team who was believed to have been killed.
 Michael Rooker as Buddy: An auto mechanic who has ties to Dom's past as a member of his father's pit crew.

 Helen Mirren as Magdalene "Queenie" Ellmanson-Shaw: The mother of Dom's former enemies Deckard and Owen.
 Kurt Russell as Mr. Nobody: An intelligence operative and the leader of a covert ops team.

 Charlize Theron as Cipher: A criminal mastermind and cyberterrorist who is an enemy of Dom's team.
 Thue Ersted Rasmussen as Otto: a son of an aristocrat who is the financier for Jakob.
 Anna Sawai as Elle: A girl whose scientist parents who were involved in the Aries project and were killed when she was young. She has since allied with Han after he saved her life and has learned martial arts and weapons to defend herself. Juju Zhang portrays a young Elle.
Additionally, J. D. Pardo portrays Jack Toretto, Jim Parrack portrays Kenny Linder, Martyn Ford portrays Sue, and Cardi B portrays Leysa, a woman who shares history with Dom and Magdalene. Karson Kern and Igby Rigney portray young versions of Vince and Jesse, respectively.

Lucas Black, Don Omar, and Shea Whigham reprise their respective roles as Sean Boswell, Santos, and Agent Michael Stasiak from previous films, while Shad Moss and Jason Tobin also reprise their respective roles as Twinkie and Earl from The Fast and the Furious: Tokyo Drift (2006). Cered and Ozuna portray young versions of Leo and Santos, respectively. Jason Statham reprises his role as Deckard Shaw in an uncredited cameo appearance during the end credits, and Puerto Rican rapper Bad Bunny appears as Lookout.

Production

Development

In November 2014, Universal Pictures chairwoman Donna Langley told The Hollywood Reporter that there would be at least three more films in the franchise after Furious 7 (2015). In October 2017, Diesel revealed in a Facebook live video that Justin Lin, who directed every film from The Fast and the Furious: Tokyo Drift through Fast & Furious 6, would be returning for the ninth and tenth films. In May 2018, Daniel Casey was hired to write the screenplay after Morgan left due to his work on Hobbs & Shaw. Neal H. Moritz returns as producer for the ninth main installment after being left out of Hobbs & Shaw.

Casting
In April 2017, Diesel and Dwayne Johnson stated that they would return. In October 2017, Jordana Brewster, who portrayed Mia Toretto in five of the franchise's films, was set to reprise her role for the ninth and tenth entries. On April 4, 2018, Johnson stated that he was now unsure if would return for the ninth film due to working on the spin-off, and he confirmed in January 2019 that he nor Statham would be returning for the ninth film due to production of the spin-off.

In June 2019, John Cena was officially cast in the film, after an initial announcement from Diesel in April. In July 2019, Finn Cole, Anna Sawai, and Vinnie Bennett joined the cast of the film. That same month, it was announced Helen Mirren and Charlize Theron would reprise their roles, with Michelle Rodriguez also confirmed to return. Michael Rooker and MMA Fighter Francis Ngannou were added to the cast in August. In October 2019, Ozuna and Cardi B joined the cast of the film.

Filming
Principal photography began on June 24, 2019, at Leavesden Studios in Hertfordshire, England. Filming took place in Los Angeles, Edinburgh, and London, and also took place in Thailand for the first time, with Krabi, Ko Pha-ngan, and Phuket used as locations. Part of the film was also shot in Tbilisi, Georgia. Filming wrapped on November 11, 2019.

In July 2019, stuntman Joe Watts, who doubled for Diesel, sustained a serious head injury during filming at Leavesden Studios. In September 2020, Michelle Rodriguez confirmed the film would be set in outer space as well, which was teased by Diesel.

Post-production

Dylan Highsmith, Kelly Matsumoto and Greg D'Auria served as the film's editors, with additional editing provided by David Kern. Peter Chiang, who worked with Lin on Star Trek Beyond, served as the overall visual effects supervisor with DNEG, Industrial Light & Magic, Lola VFX, Stereo D and Factory VFX as the vendors. DNEG also converted the film to 3D.

Music

On July 31, 2020, a mixtape titled Road to F9 was released, and features music inspired by the film. The mixtape was preceded by the lead single "One Shot" by YoungBoy Never Broke Again and Lil Baby.

Trailers for the film included the songs "Family" by The Chainsmokers and Kygo, "Is You Ready" by Migos and "Selah" by Kanye West.

The official soundtrack was released on June 16, 2021. The score album, composed by Brian Tyler was released on July 2, 2021.

Release

Theatrical
F9 had its world premiere in South Korea on May 19, 2021, the United Kingdom on June 24 and was released in the United States on June 25. The film had five previous planned release dates in the United States between 2019 and 2021; primarily changed due to the releases of the franchise spin-off Hobbs & Shaw and the James Bond film No Time to Die as well as the COVID-19 pandemic, before moving to its eventual date.

Home media
F9 was released on Blu-ray, Ultra HD Blu-ray, and DVD on September 21, 2021, by Universal Pictures Home Entertainment. These media featured the theatrical version and a director's cut version, with the latter being 7 minutes longer. The film is also offered as a ultra-high-definition steelbook featuring the poster alongside both versions of the film. It was released as a rental on VOD services in the United States on July 30, 2021. F9 was also released on Blu-Ray and DVD on October 11, 2021, in the UK by Warner Bros. Home Entertainment. In January 2022, tech firm Akami reported that F9 was the fourth most pirated film of 2021. F9 was released on HBO Max on March 4, 2022.

Reception

Box office

F9 grossed $173 million in the United States and Canada, and $553.2 million in other territories, for a worldwide total of $726.2 million.

In the United States and Canada, F9 was projected to gross $55–65 million from 4,179 theaters in its opening weekend. The film made $30 million on its first day (including $7.1 million from Thursday night previews), both the best such totals of the pandemic period. It went on to debut to $70 million, the highest-grossing weekend since Star Wars: The Rise of Skywalker ($72.4 million) in December 2019. Like previous Fast & Furious films, the audience was diverse (with 37% Hispanic, 35% Caucasian, 16% Black and 8% Asian) and skewed to both younger (51% under the age of 25) and male (57%) crowds. In its second weekend, the film fell 65% to $23 million, remaining atop the box office. With Universal's F9, The Boss Baby: Family Business, and The Forever Purge finishing in the top three spots, it marked the first time a single studio accomplished the feat since February 2005. It also crossed $100 million domestically and $500 million internationally in record time for the COVID-19 pandemic era. The film made $11.4 million but was dethroned by newcomer Black Widow the following weekend, then made $7.6 million in its fourth frame, finishing in fourth.

Over its five-day international opening weekend, beginning May 19, F9 was projected to gross $160–180 million from eight countries, including China, Russia, and South Korea. It went on to debut to $163 million, the biggest international opening for a Hollywood film since the pandemic began in March 2020. It also set the pandemic-record for IMAX gross ($14 million), and was the second-biggest May international opening ever, despite playing in 26 fewer countries than the current record holder, Captain America: Civil War. The top markets from the weekend were China ($136 million; the second biggest-ever opening of the franchise in the country), South Korea ($9.9 million), Russia ($8.3 million), Saudi Arabia ($2.67 million), and the UAE ($2.64 million). In its second weekend of international release the film made $30.8 million, including $20.3 million (-85%) in China and $3.7 million (-42%) in South Korea.

Critical response
On the review aggregator website Rotten Tomatoes, 60% of 309 critics gave F9 a positive review, with an average rating of 5.7/10. The site's critics consensus reads, "F9 sends the franchise hurtling further over the top than ever, but director Justin Lin's knack for preposterous set pieces keeps the action humming." According to Metacritic, which assigned a weighted average of 58 out of 100 based on 54 critics, the film received "mixed or average reviews". Audiences polled by CinemaScore gave the film an average grade of "B+" on an A+ to F scale, while PostTrak reported 80% of audience members gave it a positive score, with 62% saying they would definitely recommend it.

From TheWrap, Alonso Duralde summarized the film by writing that "Physics, gravity, and logic in general have long since been thrown out the window, but the jolts of pleasure keep coming." Matt Patches of Polygon criticized the film for its lack of characterization, saying, "After 20 years of Fast films, Dom is a totally functional blockbuster superhero," and that "F9 counteracts any character development by devoting a grating amount of time to meta-commentary on its own ridiculousness." However, he also praised Lin's direction and the set pieces by writing, "Each location fills Lin's pockets with the currency of imagination, which he cashes in with absolute delight. Where previous installments built off the glory of The Italian Job, The French Connection, and Mad Max: Fury Road, F9 finds inspiration in the Harlem Globetrotters. The cars catch falling bystanders, flip over enemy off-roaders, and stage intricately choreographed attacks using amped-up magnets."

Varietys Owen Gleiberman found one of the opening scenes to be "the suspenseful high point of the movie," and wrote, "The scene is so over-the-top ludicrous that it's [as] if the filmmakers were saying, 'Let's put what would have been the grand climax of Fast and Furious 4 in the opening half hour.' Good enough. But what do you do for an encore?" Writing for The Hollywood Reporter, John DeFore said that the feature "probably sounds like more fun than it is," and concluded his generally negative review by saying that "Furious 7 was a lot more fun. And, not that anyone cares, but it was more believable as well." Meanwhile, IndieWires David Ehrlich gave a more negative response with a C+ rating, and praised Lin's direction, writing, "This is a movie that sling-shots so far past self-parody that it loops all the way back to something real." Jesse Hassenger of The A. V. Club also gave the film a C+ rating, remarking that "Lin's writing just isn't as fleet as his directing—and his directing in F9 isn't as fleet as his work on Fast Five or Fast & Furious 6." He added, "The problem is all the runway in between the highlights, even longer than the endless literal concrete of the Fast & Furious 6 climax. After a reinvention as a warmer, more diverse Mission: Impossible (practically name-checked here), the series has wound up more like a mid-period James Bond movie in its channel-surfing bloat."

Accolades

Sequels

In October 2020, it was revealed that the series will conclude with a tenth and an eleventh installment, with Lin set to direct and the cast set to return for both. The first sequel, Fast X, is set to be released on May 19, 2023. Jason Momoa joined the cast as the film's villain, alongside Daniela Melchior and Brie Larson in undisclosed roles.

In April 2022, it was announced that Lin would be exiting as director for Fast X due to creative differences, although remaining as a producer. The next day, it was reported he would also be stepping down as director from its sequel. A week later, it was reported Louis Leterrier would be replacing Lin as director.

Notes

References

External links

 
 

2021 action films
2020s American films
American action films
Fast & Furious films
Films about automobiles
Films about brothers
Films about terrorism
Films directed by Justin Lin
Films postponed due to the COVID-19 pandemic
Films produced by Vin Diesel
Films produced by Neal H. Moritz
Films produced by Joe Roth
Films produced by Clayton Townsend
Films scored by Brian Tyler
Films set in outer space
Films set in Bucharest
Films set in Cologne
Films set in Edinburgh
Films set in London
Films set in Los Angeles
Films set in Tbilisi
Films set in Tokyo
Films set in 1989
Films set in 1992
Films set in 2019
Films set in a fictional country
Films shot in Edinburgh
Films shot in England
Films shot in Georgia (country)
Films shot in London
Films shot in Los Angeles
Films shot in Tbilisi
Films shot at Warner Bros. Studios, Leavesden
Films shot in Thailand
Original Film films
Universal Pictures films
4DX films
American action thriller films
2020s English-language films